A confidant is a character in a story in whom the protagonist confides.
It may also refer to:

The Confidant, a Hong Kong TV series
Confidant from the Batlló House, a piece of furniture
"Confidant", a song by Mason Jennings from the 2000 album Birds Flying Away
"Confidante", a song by Paul McCartney from the 2018 album Egypt Station

See also
Confident (disambiguation)